India–United Kingdom relations, also known as Indian–British relations or Indo–British relations, are the international relations between India and the United Kingdom. India has a high commission in London and two consulates-general in Birmingham and Edinburgh. The United Kingdom has a high commission in New Delhi and six deputy high commissions in Mumbai, Ahmedabad, Chennai, Bangalore, Hyderabad and Kolkata. Both countries are full members of the Commonwealth of Nations.

The United Kingdom has an Indian population of over 1.5 million. Former Prime Minister of the United Kingdom David Cameron described Indian–British relations as the "New Special Relationship" in 2010. According to a 2014 BBC World Service poll, 43% of Indian people view the United Kingdom's influence as positive and 27% view as negative. Similarly, 45% of Britons viewed India positively and 46% negatively.

On 25 October 2022, Rishi Sunak was appointed Prime Minister of the United Kingdom,  becoming the first British Asian and the first of Indian descent to hold that position.

History

Pre history and Early historical references 
Archaeological evidences from Iron age Poole Harbour, Dorset indicate that Durotriges had trading relations extending from Britain to India.

Anglo Saxon Chronicles for 883 AD make reference to King Alfred of Wessex sending alms to St Thomas shrine in India.

East India Company (1600–1857) 

Trade was established between Tudor England and  Mughal India in 1600 when Elizabeth I granted the newly formed East India Company a royal charter by sending precious gifts to the Mughal court of Emperor Akbar the Great. During the time of Mughal Emperor Aurangzeb in 1707, India was a leading manufacturer, with a 25 percent share of the world's GDP. By the time the British left the country its share of global GDP was near 4%. During the 18th century, the East India Company began to gain greater influence in India. The Battle of Plassey in 1757 led to the conquest of Bengal while by 1857, following various treaties and wars with Indian kingdoms (such as the Anglo-Mysore Wars with Tipu Sultan, the Anglo-Maratha Wars and both the First and Second Anglo-Sikh Wars), the East India Company controlled most of the Indian subcontinent.  Following the Indian Rebellion of 1857, where Indian sepoys rebelled against their British officers, the East India Company was dissolved the following year. The assets of the British East India Company became so huge that the British government decided to step in. India served as the main base for the British Empire's expansion across Asia and would remain the empire's most important colony and main source of income as well as soldiers until independence. Queen Victoria became Empress of India in 1876. From a small trading outpost, India became the jewel in the British crown.

British Raj (1858–1947) 

In 1858, the British Government seized control of the territories and treaty arrangements of the former East India Company. In 1876, the area, which included modern India, Pakistan, and Bangladesh, became "the Indian Empire" (often known historically as the "British Raj") with British Monarch Queen Victoria proclaimed as "Empress of India" (a title held by her successors until 1947). The British Indian Army was established and assisted Britain in many wars, including the Anglo-Afghan Wars, the Anglo-Gurkha Wars, the Anglo-Burmese Wars, the First and Second Opium Wars, and both World Wars.

The end of British rule 

The Indian independence movement gained traction following the Indian Rebellion of 1857. Opposition to British rule increased, where ideology of satyagraha or non-violence was taken to a height by Gandhiji while on another hand, 'self defense' or armed revolution embraced by Nationalists like by Bhagat Singh and Netaji Subhash Chandra Bose, eventually led to the dissolution of British Raj and Independence of India on 15 August 1947.  However, the end of the Raj also resulted the Partition of India that resulted in two new entities, Dominion of Pakistan (which included the province of East Bengal that would later achieve independence as Bangladesh) and the Dominion of India.

Dominion of India (1947–1950) 

Independence came in 1947 with the Partition of India into the dominions of India and Pakistan, within the Commonwealth of Nations. King George VI, who as British Monarch had been "Emperor of India", abandoned this title in 1947, and served as India's ceremonial head of state as 'King of India' (in much the same way, he also served as 'King of Pakistan'). In 1950 India became a republic and the link with the British crown was severed.

The Dominion was part of the Sterling Area (the Republic of India finally leaving in 1966).

Republic of India (since 1950) 

India decided to remain in the Commonwealth of Nations after becoming a Republic. Both Britain and India have since pursued quite divergent diplomatic paths.

In particular, India became a major force within the Non-Aligned Movement, which initially sought to avoid taking sides during the Cold War. This contrasted with Britain's position as a founding member of NATO, and key ally of the United States.

At any rate, between 1947 and 1997, the UK had been hostile to India virtually on all issues involving India. India’s independent ‘non-aligned’ foreign policy and its close ties with the USSR during the Cold War, had irked Britain. Britain opposed the Indian take-over of Goa from the Portuguese and Sikkim from the Maharajah. It opposed India’s nuclear tests. It kept needling India on the dispute with Pakistan over Kashmir. On its part, India opposed the invasion of Egypt during the Suez Crisis and demanded that the Indian Ocean be declared a Zone of Peace. But there was a sea change in the 1990s. Britain’s relationship with India is “primarily driven by economic considerations rather than political/normative considerations.” The disappearance of the USSR in the 1990s and the economic reforms carried out in India between 1991 and 1996, had cleared the way for better UK-India ties. India’s domestic market and its finances to invest abroad had grown exponentially. British Prime Ministers began to make a beeline to India beginning with John Major’s visit to Delhi in 1997. In 2006, UK’s Business and Enterprise Committee aimed at establishing a relationship with India “as special as the one with the US.” John Major predicted that “within 25 years India will have firmly established herself as one of the world’s economic powers”. 

Being more eager to build economic relations with India than defend the BBC, the UK foreign minister James Cleverly said: “India is a hugely important partner to the UK and the deeper ties we are forging now, will help to grow the UK economy and boost industries for the future.” He went on to announce that the UK will appoint a ‘Tech Envoy’ to the Indo-Pacific, with a focus on India. Britain has a Tech Envoy for only one other country in the world – the US. 

Through an FTA, the UK aims to double UK-India trade by 2030. Britain and India have already announced a scheme for young professionals, which will give 3,000 Indians and 3,000 Britons a pathway to live and work in each other’s countries for up to two years. This partially addresses the Indian complaint that, while UK wants Indian trade and investment, it rejects Indian immigrants/expatriates.

After India became a republic, Queen Elizabeth II visited three times, in 1961, 1983 and 1997.

Economy 
India is the second largest foreign investor in the UK. While UK ranks 18th as a trading partner of India and third after Mauritius and Singapore as an investor in India. There are many bilateral trade agreements between the two nations designed to strengthen ties. For example, in 2005, the Joint Economic and Trade Committee (JETCO) was inaugurated in New Delhi aimed at boosting two-way bilateral investments.

The growth of India's multinational companies contributed greatly to UK's business and economy. As of 2019, Indian companies in the UK generated over 48 billion pounds. Also, they have employed more than 105,000 people in the UK. Tata Group alone employed over 63,760 people in the UK. This kind of phenomenon, where non-Western countries impact the West, has been commented on by sociologist Anthony Giddens as "reverse colonialism".
At a dinner on 15 August 2017, held to mark 70 years of India's independence, UK Foreign Secretary Boris Johnson said: "We in the UK are the beneficiaries of reverse colonialism." Johnson said the Jaguar car made in Castle Bromwich and exported back to India "in ever growing numbers" incarnated the "commercial role reversal" between India and the UK.
The British government has chosen India as one of its most influential trade partners because it is one of the "fastest growing economies in the world." In 2013, Cameron formed the biggest trade delegation by accommodating more than 100 representatives that varied from multinational corporations, medium-to-small-sized corporations, and universities to India. Compared to the 2010 trade mission, the UK and India negotiated to double the trade volume by 2015. Following the trade delegation, total UK goods and services exports to India increased by 14% from January to September 2013. Between 6 and 8 November 2016, then British PM Theresa May visited India for a bilateral trip. The key topic of discussions would be May's plan for post-Brexit relations with India. Discussion on a possible free-trade agreement is also in the agenda. According to a MEA (Ministry of External Affairs, India) spokesperson, there is "substantial scope for further strengthening bilateral cooperation across a range of sectors, including science & technology, finance, trade & investment, and defense & security."

Following a meeting between Finance Minister Arun Jaitley and Chancellor of the Exchequer Philip Hammond at the 9th UK-India economic and financial dialogue, Jaitley announced that the two countries had agreed to discuss a bilateral free trade agreement. However, Jaitley stated that a formal dialogue on the agreement would only begin post-Brexit.

In September 2017 the High Commission of India in the UK, with the support of the UK India Business Council, announced the Access India programme, a unique scheme set up to help many more UK SMEs export to India. Whilst many large UK companies have a presence in India, small and medium-sized British companies do not. India hopes that the Access to India programme will not only encourage British SMEs to export to India but also inspire them to manufacture in India fulfilling the aims of the Make in India initiative.

The UK and India have remained close bilaterally, historically and on an ever expanding basis.

Political 

Politically, relations between India and the UK occur mostly through the multilateral organisations of which both are members, such as the Commonwealth of Nations, the World Trade Organization and the Asian Development Bank.

Three Presidents of India have paid state visits to the United Kingdom: Sarvepalli Radhakrishnan in June 1963, Ramaswamy Venkataraman in October 1990, and Pratibha Patil in 2009.

Elizabeth II of the United Kingdom paid state visits to India in November 1963, April 1990, and in October 1997.

Prime Minister Manmohan Singh visited the UK in 2006.

After becoming the Prime Minister of the United Kingdom, Cameron was actively involved in enhancing the Indian-British relationship on various dimensions, such as "business, energy security, climate change, education, research, security and defense, and international relations." His effort could be seen in his political visits in India on 18–20 February 2013 and on 14 November 2013. Following his visit, other politicians such as Former UK Foreign Secretary William Hague and the then Chancellor of the Exchequer George Osborne visited India to accomplish a trade mission in July 2014. During their visit, Osborne announced that a statue of Gandhi would be erected in London's Parliament Square to commemorate the 100th anniversary of Gandhi's return to India from South Africa. Upon unveiling the statue on 14 March 2015, Cameron stated that "Our ties with India have remained close throughout history and continue to go from strength to strength – through mutual respect as equals, through cooperation, trade, and of course through the one-and-a-half million Indian diasporas living in Britain today who bring our two nations closer, to the benefit of both." He further commented that the statue will "enrich the firm bond of friendship between the world's oldest democracy and its largest."

In terms of political forces behind economic development, Western powers look to India as a case study contrasting democracy-led growth and state-guided growth, the latter of which has been the modus operandi for China.

Prime Minister Narendra Modi visited the UK from 12 to 16 November 2015. During the visit, Modi became the first Indian Prime Minister to address the British Parliament. The Times of India reported that agents from Mossad and MI5 were protecting Prime Minister Narendra Modi who was heading to the 2015 G-20 Summit in Antalya, Turkey. The paper reported that the agents had been called in to provide additional cover to Modi's security detail, composed of India's Special Protection Group and secret agents from RAW and IB, in wake of the November 2015 Paris attacks.

Prime Minister Theresa May visited India on 6 November 2016 in her first bilateral visit to a non-European country since becoming Prime Minister. Explaining the decision, May said, "It [the visit] matters now more than ever. India is the fastest-growing major economy." May had previously referred to India as a "key strategic partner" in the aftermath of Britain voting to leave the European Union. She was accompanied by Trade Secretary Liam Fox and a delegation of 33 business leaders aiming to boost trade and investment between India and the United Kingdom.

At a dinner held to mark 70 years of Indian independence and 70 years of the Indian Journalists' Association on 15 August 2017, UK Foreign Secretary Boris Johnson said: "We in the UK are the beneficiaries of reverse colonialism." He gave as an example the Jaguar car made in Castle Bromwich and exported back to India, as well as the Hawk jets which are made by BAE Systems and Hindustan Aeronautics Limited. Of the Jaguar, he said the car incarnated "the commercial role reversal" between India and the UK.

At the same dinner the UK Foreign Secretary Boris Johnson said that the UK was working "ever more closely" with India to bring peace and stability to the Asia Pacific region, that the UK was increasingly co-operating in intelligence sharing with India and had no hesitation in sharing advanced technologies with India.

In 2017 Times of India reported Boris Johnson as saying that in the first half of the year Britain gave nearly 500,000 visas to Indians – an eight per cent rise on the previous year. "Britain issues more visas to Indians than any other country in the world, apart from China." Mr Johnson said.

Following a resolution passed by the Labour Party, which attempted to internationalise the Kashmir issue in September 2019, the Indian High Commission in London decided to boycott the party and its events, whilst attending events organised by the Conservative Party-affiliated Conservative Friends of India. The Labour Party was historically the party of choice for many British Indians, but has lost support to the Conservatives in recent elections.

Prime Minister Boris Johnson accepted the invitation to India's Republic Day in 2021, however, he later cancelled his itinerary due to COVID-19 pandemic in the United Kingdom. Boris Johnson had also visited Ahmedabad, Gujarat in India in April 2022.

At the International Atomic Energy Agency’s general conference in 2022, India backed AUKUS although it was opposed by Russia and China, and Indian delegates thwart Chinese related proposal.

UK formally supports India's permanent membership of United Nations Security Council.

India lodged a formal protest with the British High Commission in New Delhi after a so-called Khalistan separatist sympathizer pulled down the Indian national flag outside its embassy in London, during the Punjab local police tried to capture a Sikh separatist leader Amritpal Singh.

Education and culture exchange

Various Indian students have gone to the UK to attain higher levels of education.
From 2004 to 2009, the number of Indian students studying in the UK doubled from 10,000 to over 20,000. By 2009, India was one of the top ten countries sending students to study in the UK. Because the number of students grew, the British government and the Indian government agreed to cooperate.

During the 2010 UK-India Summit, the Prime Minister of the United Kingdom and India came into agreement to support education by implementing the India Education and Research Initiative (UKIERI). In this summit, Cameron stated that "Education is an area where India and the UK could pool some of the advantages for mutual benefit." He continued by stating that a higher quality of education would lead to providing opportunities for all, thus encouraging economic growth and overcoming poverty in India. However, after its implementation, the number of Indian students studying in the UK did not increase as expected by both governments.

In 2010, the then Home Secretary Theresa May announced a stricter immigration law. This included tighter rules for international students. Students were forced to return to their homeland after earning their degrees. Since the immigration law, there has been a rapid decrease of 25% in the number of first year students from India during the year 2012–2013.

Theresa May's action has been criticised by people such as historian Edward Acton. Acton stated that this action is "butchering" the Anglo-Indian friendship because it is "treating university students as immigrants." The continuous drop in the number of international students, including Indians, has become controversial. Business leaders such as Sir James Dyson have commented that forcing international students to move back to their homeland can be detrimental to the British economy in the long term.

In March 2015, Phillip Hammond stated during an interview with DD News that Theresa May's policy has been cancelled. Starting in 2015, Indian students are able to stay in the UK for six months after their graduation.

Boris Johnson told Times of India in 2017 that "the number of Indian students in the UK continues to rise. Our most recent figures show a 10% increase in Indian students gaining visas – and 91% of these applications are successful. We want the brightest and best Indian students to attend our great universities; there is no limit to the number of genuine Indian students who can study in Britain," he said in the interview.

2017 UK-India Year of Culture
Queen Elizabeth hosted the official launch of the UK India Year of Culture on 27 February 2017 at Buckingham Palace with Indian Finance Minister Arun Jaitley representing Prime Minister Narendra Modi. The British Council worked with the Palace and British-Indian start-up Studio Carrom to project a peacock, India's national bird, onto the facade of Buckingham Palace.

The programme for the year was announced by UK Minister of State for Digital and Culture Rt Hon Matt Hancock, Indian High Commissioner to the United Kingdom HE Mr Sinha and British Council Deputy Chair Rt Hon Baroness Prashar CBE PC, at the British Film Institute on 28 February 2017. The programme includes an exhibition from the British Museum and The Chhatrapati Shivaji Maharaj Vastu Sangrahalaya in Mumbai, the first exhibition on Indian innovation at the UK's Science Museum, London, and the restoration of 1928 Indian movie, Shiraz, by the British Film Institute with a new score by British-Indian musician Anoushka Shankar.

The British Council inaugurated the Year of Culture in India on 6 April 2017 projecting elements of the Buckingham Palace Studio Carrom peacock onto the British Council's Delhi building and launching an interactive music app Mix the City Delhi.

See also

List of High Commissioners of India to the United Kingdom
Cayman Islands–India relations
India–European Union relations
India–United Kingdom bus routes
Anglo-Indians
British Indians

References

External links 

Official Site of High Commission of India in United Kingdom
The official website for the British High Commission in India
Re-Imagine:India UK Cultural Relations in the 21st 

 
United Kingdom 
Bilateral relations of the United Kingdom 
Relations of colonizer and former colony